Miguel Ángel Borja Hernández (born 26 January 1993) is a Colombian footballer who plays as a forward for Argentinian club River Plate, and the Colombia national team.

Club career

Colombia
Borja began his career with Deportivo Cali, making his professional debut in 2011. That same year, he was transferred to Cucuta Deportivo, club in which he had few chances to play. He would soon be transferred again, this time to play for Categoría Primera B side, Cortuluá. Borja would make a name for himself in the second division of Colombia, often being referred to as a 'fast' and 'complete goalscorer', as well as boasting impressive strength on the ball. His impressive performances with Cortuluá eventually led him to becoming an alternative striker for Colombia's national under-20 team in 2013. On 17 January 2013, it was reported that Independiente Medellin had been interested in acquiring Borja's services. However, nothing was finalized and Borja was eventually sold to first division side, La Equidad. In his 2 disputable games, Borja scored 4 goals before being transferred to Serie A side Livorno.

Livorno and Olimpo
During the summer of 2013, it was confirmed that Borja would join Italian club Livorno on loan. The loan consisted of a fee of €150,000 with an option to buy for €1.5 million.

His debut for Le Triglie came on 20 October, coming off the bench in a 1–2 loss to Sampdoria.

Borja made seven season appearances for the club but failed to score a goal. Livorno was eventually regulated to the Serie B after placing last for the season. 

Shortly after Livorno were relegated, Borja was sent on loan to Argentine club Club Olimpo, where he scored three in sixteen games.

Return to Colombia
Borja was loaned to Independiente Santa Fe for the second half of 2015. That season, Borja scored ten goals in thirty-three matches. He won the 2015 Copa Sudamericana with the team (he played seven matches with no goals).

For the 2016 season, he was sold to Cortuluá who was 17th in the league the previous season. In the Apertura tournament of the season, Borja scored a record of nineteen goals in twenty-one matches, breaking the record of most goals scored by a player in a league tournament (since 2002, the league is divided in two tournaments, Apertura and Finalización, each season). The previous record was held by Jackson Martínez, with eighteen goals in the 2009 Finalización. His team Cortuluá reached the Semifinals, which they lost to Independiente Medellín.

He was transferred again on 8 June, this time to Atlético Nacional. On 6 July, during his first match for his new team, while playing against São Paulo in the semi-finals of the Copa Libertadores, he scored twice, a feat he repeated in the second leg a week after. Then, on 27 July 2016, he went on to score the definitive goal in the final series against Ecuadorian  team Independiente del Valle, which Atlético Nacional ended up winning 2–1 on the aggregate.

Palmeiras
On 9 February 2017, it was announced that Borja had agreed to transfer to Brazilian side Palmeiras. He signed a five-year deal for a fee believed to be around US$10.5 million. Borja became the fourth most expensive transfer of Brazilian football.

Junior 
On 28 December 2019, Borja signed a one-year loan deal with Atlético Junior.

Grêmio 
On 5 August 2021, Borja signed with Grêmio until December 2022, loaned from Palmeiras.

River Plate 
On 12 July 2022, Borja signed a contract with Argentine giants River Plate, running until December 2025.

International career
Borja was included in Colombia's 23 man squad for the 2018 FIFA World Cup in Russia, making one substitute appearance in the group stage match against Senegal.

Career statistics

Club

International

Scores and results list Colombia's goal tally first.

Honours
Independiente Santa Fe
Superliga Colombiana: 2015
Copa Sudamericana: 2015

Atlético Nacional
Copa Colombia: 2016
Copa Libertadores: 2016

Palmeiras
Campeonato Brasileiro Série A: 2018

Colombia U20
South American Youth Championship: 2013

Individual
South American Footballer of the Year: 2016
Campeonato Paulista top scorer: 2018
Campeonato Paulista Team of the Year: 2018

Personal life
Borja was in 2021 linked with Colombian television journalist and writer Diva Jessurum. She has denied the rumors.

References

External links

1993 births
Living people
People from Córdoba Department
Colombian footballers
Categoría Primera A players
Cúcuta Deportivo footballers
Cortuluá footballers
La Equidad footballers
U.S. Livorno 1915 players
Olimpo footballers
Independiente Santa Fe footballers
Atlético Nacional footballers
Serie A players
Argentine Primera División players
Colombian expatriate footballers
Expatriate footballers in Argentina
Expatriate footballers in Italy
Expatriate footballers in Brazil
Colombian expatriate sportspeople in Argentina
Colombian expatriate sportspeople in Italy
Colombian expatriate sportspeople in Brazil
Colombia under-20 international footballers
Colombia international footballers
Footballers at the 2016 Summer Olympics
Olympic footballers of Colombia
Sociedade Esportiva Palmeiras players
Grêmio Foot-Ball Porto Alegrense players
Campeonato Brasileiro Série A players
Association football forwards
Copa Libertadores-winning players
2018 FIFA World Cup players
2021 Copa América players
Atlético Junior footballers
Colombian people of African descent